Table tennis competitions at the 2022 South American Games in Asuncion, Paraguay were held between October 9 and 14, 2022 at the Federación Paraguaya de Tenis de Mesa.

Schedule
The competition schedule is as follows:

Medal summary

Medal table

Medalists

Men

Women

Mixed

Participation
Twelve nations participated in table tennis events of the 2022 South American Games.

References

Table tennis
South American Games
2022